Ellsworth F. Bunker (May 11, 1894 – September 27, 1984) was an American businessman and diplomat (including being the ambassador to Argentina, Italy, India, Nepal and South Vietnam). He is perhaps best known for being a hawk on the war in Vietnam and Southeast Asia during the 1960s and 1970s. , Bunker is one of two people to receive the Presidential Medal of Freedom twice, and the only to do so with distinction twice.

Early life and education
Born in Yonkers, New York, he was the eldest of three children of George Raymond Bunker and Jeanie Polhemus (née Cobb), whose family descended from prominent early Dutch settlers including the Evertson family (of the Great Nine Partners) and the Schuyler family. His great-grandmother Eliza Brodhead Polhemus née Heyer was a niece of Stephen Whitney, reputedly the wealthiest American of his time after John Jacob Astor, while her first cousin Charles Suydam was the brother-in-law of Astor's grandson William Backhouse Astor Jr. and his wife Caroline Schermerhorn Astor. 

Bunker's father was one of the founders and chairman of the board of National Sugar Refining Company. His younger brother, Arthur Hugh Bunker (July 29, 1895 – May 19, 1964), was also a noted businessman, chairman of the executive committee of the War Production Board (1941–1945) during World War II, and president and then board chairman of American Metal Climax (AMAX). He was married to actress and writer Isabel Leighton. His first cousin Dorothy Penrose Cobb was married to historian Frederick Lewis Allen.

Ellsworth Bunker studied to be a lawyer, and graduated from Yale University with the class of 1916. During World War II he served as chairman of the War Production Board's cane sugar advisory committee.

Career

Bunker first worked in his father's company, National Sugar Refining Company, eventually becoming the company's president, succeeding Horace Havemeyer Sr., in 1942. He retired as an active executive in 1951 and purchased a 600-acre dairy farm in Putney, Vermont. He remained a member of the board of National Sugar until 1966.

He then moved to government during the Harry S. Truman administration, when Truman appointed him ambassador to Argentina in April 1951. Next he was ambassador to Italy in February 1952. From November 1953 until November 1956 he was president of the American Red Cross. In November 1956 he was appointed ambassador to India and Nepal by Dwight D. Eisenhower, and sworn in December 1956, where he played a crucial role in the covert alliance between the two powers against China. He was replaced by John Kenneth Galbraith in 1961. During 1962 he acted as U.S. mediator in the New York Agreement over Western New Guinea.

After a period back in Washington, D.C., he was made U.S. ambassador to the Organization of American States, 1964–1966. President Lyndon B. Johnson appointed him U.S. ambassador to South Vietnam, 1967–1973. Once in Saigon, he strongly supported the war efforts of Presidents Johnson and Richard Nixon, and applauded US incursions into Laos and Cambodia. Following the conclusion of the Vietnam War, Bunker headed the US team involved in the drawing up of the 1977 Torrijos-Carter Treaties.

He was awarded the Presidential Medal of Freedom with Distinction twice—the first time by John F. Kennedy in 1963 (though the ceremony took place during Lyndon B Johnson's term) and the second time by Lyndon B. Johnson in 1967. He is one of only two persons (the other being Colin Powell) who received the award twice, and the only person to receive it both times with distinction.

Personal life
Bunker married a neighbor, Harriet Allen Butler, daughter of Ellen Mudge and George Prentiss Butler, in Yonkers, New York on April 24, 1920. Harriet had made friends with Bunkers' sister Katherine when the two girls attended Miss Porter's School in Farmington, Connecticut. They had three children, John Birkbeck, Samuel Emmet, and Ellen Mudge. She died in 1964.

On January 3, 1967 he married fellow ambassador Caroline Clendening "Carol" Laise in Katmandu, Nepal. She died in 1991. Ambassador Laise was a friend of the first Mrs. Bunker.

Bunker died on his dairy farm in Putney, Vermont. The funeral was attended by his good friend and neighbor former senator George Aiken and former president Richard M. Nixon. Aiken died two months later.

His middle child, John Birkbeck Bunker (March 8, 1926 – May 26, 2005), a first lieutenant in World War II, died of cancer at his home in Wheatland, Wyoming at age 79.

In popular culture
 In a 1977 Doonesbury cartoon, one of the supposed terms of the Torrijos–Carter Treaties was that "We get to keep Ellsworth Bunker."
 In a 1978 Doonesbury cartoon, a New York tailor fitting Phred with a very old-fashioned suit says "Ellsworth Bunker used to get everything from me". 
 Bunker is mentioned in Allen Ginsberg's poem "September on Jessore Road", which includes the line "Where is Ambassador Bunker today? Are his Helios machine gunning children at play?"

References

External links
 Oral History Interviews with Ellsworth Bunker, from the Rutherford Living History project at Duke University.
Part 1: The Making of a Diplomat, with David Barber (February 26, 1979)
Part 2: Vietnam, with Bruce Kuniholm (February 26, 1979)
Part 3: India, with Ralph Braibanti (February 26, 1979)
Part 4: Latin America, with Arturo Valenzuela (February 27, 1979)
Part 5: Lecture Follow-up, with Taylor Cole (February 28, 1979)
Part 6: Europe, with Charles Maier (February 28, 1979)
 
 "Ambassador Bunker meeting the press; Saigon.", photograph; "Bunker with Zorthian; Saigon" as Bunker speaks to reporters, photograph; "Ambassador Ellsworth Bunker arrival in Saigon; Top U.S. officials: Barry Zorthian, Jack Steward, Porter Calhoun" (Bunker not pictured), photograph; all "date covered" April 25, 1967 and credited to François Sully; all copyright Healey Library, UMass Boston; via openvault.wgbh.org. Zorthian was press media advisor to the ambassador.

1894 births
1984 deaths
Presidential Medal of Freedom recipients
Ambassadors of the United States to South Vietnam
Permanent Representatives of the United States to the Organization of American States
Ambassadors of the United States to India
American people of Dutch descent
Schuyler family
Woodhull family
Recipients of the President's Award for Distinguished Federal Civilian Service
20th-century American diplomats